A list of films produced by the Marathi language film industry based in Maharashtra in the year 1925.

1925 Releases
A list of Marathi films released in 1925.

References

External links
Gomolo - 

Lists of 1925 films by country or language
1925
1925 in Indian cinema